Half Asleep in Frog Pajamas is a 1994 novel by Tom Robbins, published by Bantam Books.

Overview
Like Robbins' other books, the plot involves an eclectic mix of characters and complicated scenarios, and mixes the mundane with the mysterious, in the form of the Sirius mysteries and the mythology surrounding the Dogon Tribe. Unlike his other books, Half Asleep is written entirely in the second person, present tense.

Robbins was a personal friend of Terence McKenna, whose influence is evident in several of his books. A main character in Half Asleep in Frog Pajamas named Larry Diamond advocates a theory similar to those of McKenna, involving psilocybin.

Release details
 Hardcover –  published on August 1, 1994 by Bantam Books
 Paperback –  published on November 1, 1995 by Bantam Books

References

External links
 Review at Blather.net

1994 American novels
Novels by Tom Robbins
Novels about ancient astronauts
Second-person narrative novels